William Vyvyan (fl. 1325), was an English Member of Parliament.

He was a Member (MP) of the Parliament of England for New Shoreham in 1325.

References

Year of birth missing
14th-century deaths
14th-century English people
People from Shoreham-by-Sea
Members of the Parliament of England (pre-1707)